La magia de Sofía or Sofía's magic or Sofia's World of Magic is a Colombian children's telenovela, produced by Colombiana de Televisión for Caracol Television in 2010.  Starring Nicolás Nocetti, Isabela Córdoba and the girl Sara Pinzón as Sofía.

Also, Dora Cadavid's son, Moisés Cadavid worked with Caracol in producing the show.

La magia de Sofía is a story that will be told through Sofia's eyes and will tell how she will have to face the unknown and she will do it from the curiosity of someone who does not understand why adults seem to be experts in complicating everything, when the life can be so simple.

It depicts a young girl's inspired attempt to understand the adults around her, the world they live in and their inexplicable talent to choose complication over simplicity, a simplicity she knows well from the stories her grandfather always read to her.

Synopsis 

Sofia is a girl who faces the unknown when she tries to understand why adults seem to be experts in complicating everything, when life can be so simple.  Therefore, to find her answers, she turns to the stories that her grandfather and her father have told her, to find similarities between those stories and the situations that haunt her life.  In her own magical universe of hers, Sofia imagines happy endings in the complex world of people older than her.  This telenovela contains a great cast with well-known actors in different telenovelas (Nicolas Nocetti, Isabela Córdoba, Federico Amando, Ana Victoria Beltran, among others) and new actors who are launching into stardom (Sara Pinzón, Daniel Medina, Margarita Duran, Santiago Cepeda, Tatiana Santos, among others).

Cast 

 Sara Pinzón: Sofía Protagonist (Gabeto's daughter)
 Nicolás Nocetti: Gabeto Protagonist (Father of Sofía and in love with María Clara)
 Isabela Córdoba: María Clara Protagonist (In Love with Gabeto, Cousin of Ernesto and Sebastián)
 Guest starring, Ana María Abello as Leonor

Internationally
: Media World : Televen : Quiero TV, Televisa.

References

Colombian telenovelas
2010 telenovelas
Spanish-language telenovelas